Electric Circus is the fifth studio album by American rapper Common, released on December 10, 2002, on the now-defunct MCA Records. The album was highly anticipated and praised by many critics for its ambitious vision. However, it was not as commercially successful as his previous album, Like Water for Chocolate, selling under 300,000 copies. An eclectic album, Electric Circus features fusions of several genres such as hip hop, pop, rock, electronic, and neo soul. "I wasn't feeling hip hop," the rapper remarked. "So my motivation for that album were other genres of music, like Pink Floyd and Jimi Hendrix. It wasn't hip hop." This was Common's second and last album for MCA.

Music

Common worked with a large (and eclectic) number of musicians on Electric Circus. Among them were Mary J. Blige (who provided vocals for the album's lead single, "Come Close"), The Neptunes, Lætitia Sadier (of Stereolab), Cee-Lo Green, J Dilla, Bilal and Jill Scott. The music on Electric Circus challenges the boundaries of the hip hop genre in a similar fashion to The Roots' Phrenology (2002) and Outkast's Speakerboxxx/The Love Below (2003). This is especially the case on tracks like the grungy "Electric Wire Hustler Flower" (featuring P.O.D.'s Sonny Sandoval in the chorus), the abstract "Aquarius", and the electronic "New Wave". Erykah Badu joins Common for a duet on ("Jimi Was A Rock Star"), which is a dedication to Jimi Hendrix. The second Neptunes collaboration on the record, the cross-genre "I Got A Right Ta", is a musical departure from the styles of both artists, and features Pharrell singing the hook in a blues-inspired style.  A triumphant sounding Common proclaims himself "the only cat in hip hop that can go into a thrift shop, bring that get up to the ghetto and get props". The song was placed on the B-Side of "Come Close".

"Between Me, You & Liberation", in which Common discusses sexual abuse and its effects on a young woman, confronting his homophobia after learning about the sexuality of a longtime friend, and the loss of a relative to cancer, contains themes considered to be wholly unusual for a rap song at the time of its release, and is, perhaps, the rapper's most vulnerable moment on record. About "Liberation..." Pop Matters wrote that it's "one of those rare occasions when a male hip-hop artist owns up to his investment in some of the genre's more unsavory sexual politics". Musically, the song is very downbeat and moody, and features a guest spot from rapper/singer/producer Cee-lo Green (making this the pair's third collaboration after One Day It'll All Make Sense's "G.O.D.", and Like Water For Chocolate's "A Song For Assata").

Following LWFCs tributes to Fela Kuti, and Assata Shakur, Electric Circus pays homage to someone altogether more familiar (Jimi Hendrix) on "Jimi Was A Rock Star".  The 8 minute-plus song is a duet between Common and his then-girlfriend Erykah Badu, which gradually builds up into its cryptic, chanting finale. This song is Common's first all-singing performance. The center-piece of the album, the epic "Heaven Somewhere", features 6 vocalists who all give insight into what their interpretation of Heaven is. Common's father Lonnie Lynn ends the affair with an introspective look at his ideal place.

Reception

Critical

The album's style tended to divide critics; most praised its ambitious vision while some criticized it for the same reason. Most of the criticism tended to revolve around the album's experimental nature. Some felt Common had strayed too far from his previous sound. Longtime Common fans also viewed his relationship with Erykah Badu as having an overly experimental influence on him, while some critics compared the album to Marvin Gaye's I Want You and Richard Ashcroft's Human Conditions, both of which were experimental works that initially received mixed criticism. In a 2003 review, Nick Southall of Stylus Magazine gave the album a D+ and wrote:

Official reviews were mostly positive. "Pushing past the accepted boundaries of contemporary black pop" is how PopMatters described the album by giving it all ten stars.  Likewise, Playlouder gave it four stars out of five, calling it "a brilliant, visionary album", as did Rolling Stone who only gave it three stars out of five and saw it as "breaking hip-hop rules with a freewheeling fearlessness." Ink Blot Magazine's Matt Cibula called it his "favorite record of 2002". The Independent gave it a favorable review and called it "is the most heartening recent development in hip hop, the kind of album that might help lead the genre out of its present darkness." The Village Voice gave it an average review and said it "sounds chocolatey and recombinant even when it doth protest the Enlightened Guy angle too much." RapReviews gave it a score of 7 out of 10 and said, "Last time around on 'Like Water for Chocolate' Common still had his Chicago flows, just spiced a little differently with Okayplayer oregano. This could and SHOULD have worked again, but the mix this time is bitter and leaves me feeling a little salty. The 'Electric Circus' could rightly have been called the 'Eclectic Circus' for the unconventional way it tries to combine disparate elements into a cohesive whole."

Commercial
Despite the critical approval, the record debuted at #47 on the Billboard 200 chart, 31 spots lower than Like Water for Chocolate's highest chart position. With "Come Close" as the only single, the album quickly fell off the charts altogether, and MCA Records halted any further promotion. Part of the reason for its lack of promotion was MCA's absorption under Geffen Records in spring 2003, a mere four months after the album's release.  Since both labels were under the Universal Music Group, Common's record contract would be carried over to Geffen, but the handling of Electric Circus (an already under-performing album) was neglected. The lack of promotion may have also led to only 295,000 copies being sold based on 2005 Nielsen SoundScan statistics.

In a 2006 interview concurrent with the release of The Roots' album Game Theory, Questlove, the album's executive producer, maintained that Common's relationship with Erykah Badu had little influence on the album and stated that the greater influence was the recording atmosphere at the famous Electric Lady Studios (built by Jimi Hendrix) and the group of artists that Common was collaborating with at the time:

Album cover
The album's cover appears to be a nod to "Midnight Marauders", the third studio album by American hip hop group A Tribe Called Quest, released on November 9, 1993. Also, The Beatles' 1967 album Sgt. Pepper's Lonely Hearts Club Band, another work known for its experimental nature. The images (a mixture of known personalities, personal friends, and family of the artist) represent those directly or indirectly involved in, or influential to the making of the album. The 87 people depicted in the photos are:

Common (in the center), (from top-left to bottom-right) Prince, Leroy Matthais, Simon Johns, Chad Hugo, Larenz Tate, Stic.man, Pharrell, Mattie Turner, Kenyetta Snyder, Big Daddy Kane, Vinia Mojica, Erykah Badu, Rahsaan Abraham, James Poyser, Tim Gane, DJ Dumi, Questlove, Black Thought, Grandma Gipson, Marie Daulne, Richard Pryor, Marlon Everett, Jay Dee (J Dilla), Mary Campbell, Steef Van De Gevel, M-1, Don "Babatunde" Eaton, Tye Tribbett, Pino Palladino, Abiodun Oyewole, Andrew Dosunmu, Umar Bin Hassan, Louis Farrakhan, Joseph Sharrieff, Steve Mandel, Jimi The Cat, Dartanian Donaldson, Mary Hansen, Steve Hess, Morgane Lhote, Kimberly Jones, Aunt Stella, Q-Tip, Marc Baptiste, Grandma Mable Lynn, Derek Dudley, Uncle Charles, Uncle Steve, John Hancock, Bob Power, Koryan Wright, Ashaka Givens, Dwayne Lyle, Eevin Wright, Russ Elevado, Marcus Murray, Barbara Sims, Rachelle, Cee-Lo Green, Jill Scott, Bayatae Abraham, Charlie Malone, Jeff Lee Johnson, Assata Shakur, Leslie Sims, Angela Murray, Kolleen "Queenie" Wright, Lætitia Sadier, Cousin Bianca, Omoye Lynn, Mary J. Blige, Grandma Elva Brown, Millie Malone, Chris Webber, Bilal, Lonnie "Pops" Lynn, Jimi Hendrix, George Daniels, Fred Hampton Jr., Fred Hampton, Omar, Seven, Karriem Riggins, Ma, and Ralph.

Track listing
Writing credits by Allmusic.com.Notes'
  signifies a co-producer.

Personnel
By Allmusic.com.

 ?uestlove: Assistant, Drums, Executive Producer, Handclapping, Mixing, Producer
 Jon Adler: Assistant
 Marc Baptiste: Photography
 Anthony Bell: Engineer
 Damen Bennett: Flute
 Bilal: Vocals (Background)
 Mary J. Blige: Vocals
 Jill Scott: Vocals (Background)
 Erykah Badu: Vocals (Background)
 Jim Bottari: Assistant
 Josh Butler: Vocal Engineer
 Cee-Lo: Vocals
 Michael Chavez: A&R
 Jeff Chestek: Assistant, Engineer, String Engineer
 Andrew Coleman: Engineer
 Common: Executive Producer
 Tom Coyne: Mastering
 Tim Day: Engineer
 Timothy Day: Engineer
 J Dilla: Drums, Moog, Electric Guitar, Producer
 Derek Dudley: Executive Producer
 Russell Elevado: Mixing
 Todd Fairall: Assistant, Engineer
 Larry Gold: String Arrangements
 Alicia Graham: A&R
 Kenny J. Gravillis: Design
 The Guess Who: A&R
 Nick Howard: Assistant
 Bobbi Humphrey: Flute
 Femi Jiya: Assistant, Engineer

 Jef Lee Johnson: Guitar, Producer
 Scott Kieklak: Vocal Engineer
 Koski Budabin, Dylan: Assistant
 Dustin Kreidler: Assistant
 Joe Lepinski: Assistant
 Steve Mandel: Assistant, Engineer
 Mark McLaughlin: Assistant
 Shinobu Mitsuoka: Assistant
 Ryan Moys: Engineer
 Pino Palladino: Bass, Producer
 Nicholas Payton: Trumpet
 Bob Power: Mixing
 Bob Powers: Mixing
 James Poyser: Associate Executive Producer, Guitar, Handclapping, Keyboards, Piano, Producer
 Prince: Guitar, Keyboards
 Karriem Riggins: Producer
 Steve Russell: Vocal Engineer
 Chris Steinmetz: Engineer
 Phil Tan: Mixing
 Greg Tardy: Cornet
 Shawn Taylor: Assistant
 Mike Tocci: Assistant, Engineer
 G.A.: Vocals (Background)
 Tye Tribbett: Vocals (Background)
 Steef Van De Gevel: Assistant
 Patrick Viala: Mixing
 Blair Wells: Digital Editing
 Pharrell Williams: Vocals (Background)

Chart history

Weekly charts

Year-end charts

Singles

See also 
 Love for Sale (album), an album by Bilal, also recorded around this time at Electric Lady Studios and featuring Common

References

External links
 

2002 albums
Common (rapper) albums
MCA Records albums
Albums produced by the Neptunes
Albums produced by Questlove
Albums produced by J Dilla
Albums produced by James Poyser
Albums recorded at Electric Lady Studios
LGBT-related albums